Reginald II of Guelders, called "the Black" (c. 1295 – 12 October 1343), was Count of Guelders, and from 1339 onwards Duke of Guelders, and Zutphen, in the Low Countries, from 1326 to 1343. He was the son of Reginald I of Guelders and Marguerite of Flanders.

Biography
From 1316, he acted as regent in the county, imprisoned his father in 1318, and governed as "son of the Count". When in 1326 his father died, he styled himself Count of Guelders and Count of Zutphen. In 1339 Guelders was raised to a duchy. He was a law giver, in 1321 on customary law, and in 1335 on dykes and canals.

He allied himself against the French with Edward III of England, his brother-in-law, warning the English in 1338 of a French fleet gathering in the mouth of the Zwin. He remained Edward's closest ally among the German princes in the first phase of the Hundred Years War.

Family
Reginald's first marriage (Roermond, 11 January 1311) was to Sophia Berthout (died 1329), Lady of Mechelen. Their children were:
 Marguerite (1320–1344), Lady of Mechelen
 Mathilde (1325–1384), Lady of Mechelen, then Duchess of Guelders (1371–1379), who married:
 in 1336, Godfried van Loon-Heinsberg (d. 1347)
 before 1348, John of Cleves (d. 1368), Count of Cleves
 John II, Count of Blois (d. 1381)
 Elisabeth (d. 1376), Abbess of Gravendaal
 Marie (d. 1405), Duchess of Guelders (1371–1405), married William II, Duke of Jülich

Widowed, Reginald married, at Nijmegen, May 1332, Eleanor of Woodstock (1318–1355), daughter of Edward II of England. Their children were:

 Reginald III of Guelders (1333–1371), Duke of Guelders (1343–1361)
 Edward of Guelders (1336–1371), Duke of Guelders (1361–1371)

He excluded Eleanor from court in 1338, claiming she had leprosy, she later became a nun after his death.

Reginald died at Arnhem after a fall from his horse.

Sources

Notes

References

1295 births
1343 deaths
People from Gelderland
Dukes of Guelders
House of Wassenberg